Deng Xiaoping is a 2002 Chinese film directed by Ding Yinnan and starring veteran actor Lu Qi as the aged Deng Xiaoping. The biopic was the first major film on the life of Deng Xiaoping, though it only covers the twenty years from his return to power in 1976, to his last visit to Southern China in 1991.

References

2002 films
Chinese historical films
Chinese drama films
Films set in the 1970s
Films set in the 1980s
Films set in the 1990s
Films shot in China
Films set in China
Cultural depictions of Deng Xiaoping
Biographical films about politicians
Biographical films about prime ministers
2000s political films
2000s historical films
2000s Chinese films